is a national park in the Chūbu region of Honshū, Japan. Established in 1962, it spans the borders of Fukui, Gifu, Ishikawa, and Toyama prefectures. Its main geographical feature is Mount Haku. In 1980 an area of 480 km² corresponding to the national park was designated a UNESCO Man and the Biosphere Reserve.

History
The park was originally designated , in 1955. It received full national park status in 1962.

Flora and fauna
The vegetation of the park ranges from warm temperate to alpine zones. The base of the mountains is covered by coniferous forests, dominated by firs, pines and Japanese cedar. Deciduous forests and woodlands, dominated by Mongolian oak and Japanese beech are present. At higher elevations there are open landscapes.

Hakusan is home to the golden eagle, the mountain hawk-eagle and several larger mammal species typical for the Japanese islands, like Japanese macaque, Asiatic black bear, Japanese serow and Sika deer.

Sites of interest
, Mount Haku,

Neighboring municipalities
 Fukui: Ōno, Katsuyama
 Gifu: Gujō, Takayama, Shirakawa, Gifu
 Ishikawa: Hakusan
 Toyama: Nanto

See also

List of national parks of Japan

References

External links
  Hakusan National Park
  Hakusan National Park
 Map of Hakusan National Park

National parks of Japan
Parks and gardens in Fukui Prefecture
Parks and gardens in Gifu Prefecture
Parks and gardens in Ishikawa Prefecture
Parks and gardens in Toyama Prefecture
Protected areas established in 1962
1962 establishments in Japan